The 1957 Round Australia Trial, officially the Mobilgas Rally was the seventh running of the Round Australia Trial. The rally took place between 21 August and 8 September 1957. The event covered 14,480 kilometres around Australia. It was won by Laurie Whitehead and Kevin Young, driving a Volkswagen 1200.

Results

References

Rally competitions in Australia
Round Australia Trial